This article details the 2016 Santosh Trophy qualifiers.

Format
Qualifiers are being held from 6 February to 23 February 2016 and consist of 35 teams. Top 2 teams from each zone will make it to the final round.

North Zone

Group A

Group B

South Zone

Group A

Group B

West Zone

East Zone

Group A

Group B

North East Zone

Group A

Group B

References

External links
 Santosh Trophy 2016 - Kolkatafootball.com

2015–16 Santosh Trophy